Sycacantha exedra is a species of moth of the family Tortricidae. It is found in Australia, where it has been recorded from Queensland.

The wingspan is about 18 mm. The forewings are fuscous, mixed with brownish and whitish. There are dark-fuscous and whitish strigulae (fine streaks) on the costa. The hindwings are dark grey.

References

Moths described in 1916
Olethreutini
Sycacantha